Wojdan is both a surname and a given name. Notable people with the name include:

 Krzysztof Wojdan (born 1968), Polish judoka
 Wojdan Shaherkani (born 1996), Saudi judoka

See also
 Wojda
 Wojdat